The Bulldog-class steam vessels (SV2) later reclassed as First Class Sloops, were designed by Sir William Symonds, the Surveyor of the Navy. The changes included lengthening the bow by 10 feet to provide 6 feet of extra space in the engine room. Three vessels would have a single funnel whereas Scourge would have two and be completed as a bomb vessel. In July 1844 it was queried if Fury was to be completed as a screw vessel, however, since her construction was well along she would be completed as a paddle steamer. Four vessels were ordered and completed.

Inflexible was the third vessel to carry this name since it was used for an 18-gun sloop, launched by St John's at Lake Champlain on 1 October 1776 and whose fate is unknown.

Scourge was the sixth named vessel since it was used for a 14-gun brig-sloop, launched by Allin of Dover on 26 October 1779, purchased on the stocks and foundered off the Dutch coast on 7 November 1795.

Bulldog was the third vessel so named since it was used for a 16-gun sloop, launched by Ladd of Dover on 10 November 1782, made a bomb in 1798, converted to a powder hulk 1801 Breaking completed at Portsmouth in December 1829. The vessel had been in French hands from 27 February 1801 to 16 September 1801.

Fury was the eighth named vessel since it was used for a 14-gun sloop, launched by Lime & Mackenzie of Leith on 18 March 1779 and broken in April 1787.

Design and specifications
The first three vessels were ordered on 18 March 1841 with the fourth vessel ordered on 19 February 1844. The ships were laid down as follows: Inflexible - January 1844 at Pembroke; Scourge February 1844 at Portsmouth; Bulldog July 1844 at Chatham; and Fury in June 1845 at Sheerness. The vessels were launched between November 1844 and December 1845. The builder's measure calculated at  tons.

The machinery was supplied by various suppliers. All had rectangular fire-tube boilers installed. The engine manufacturers were as follows:
 Inflexible - supplied by Fawcett, Preston & Company of Liverpool. The engine was a two-cylinder vertical single expansion (VSE) direct acting steam engine rated at 378 nominal horsepower (NHP). When run on trials the engine generated 680 indicated horsepower (IHP) for a speed of 9.5 knots.
 Scourge - supplied by Maudslay, Sons & Field of Lambeth. The engine was a two-cylinder VSR direct acting steam engine rated at 420 NHP.
 Bulldog - supplied by J. and G. Rennie of Greenwich. The engine was a two-cylinder VSR direct acting steam engine rated at 420 NHP then rerated at 500 NHP and had a speed of 10.2 knots.
 Fury - supplied by Rigby of Liverpool. The engine was a two-cylinder VSR direct acting steam engine rated at 515 NHP for a speed of 10.5 knots.

Their initial armament for Inflexible, Bulldog, and Fury was two 42-pounder 84 hundredweight (cwt) 10-foot muzzle loading smooth bore (MLSB) guns on pivot mounts with two 68-pounder 64 cwt 9-foot MLSB guns and two 42-pounder 22 cwt carronades on broadside trucks. In 1862 the armament was changed to either one 68-pounder 84 cwt 10-foot MLSB gun or one Armstrong 7-inch (110-pounder) rifled breech loader (RBL) gun on a pivot mount with four 32-pounder 42 cwt MLSB guns on broadside trucks. Scourge being completed as a bomb was armed with one 13-inch mortar with two 68-pounder 95 cwt 10-foot MLSB guns on broadside trucks on the upper deck.

Initial cost of vessels
Inflexible: Total Cost £50,114 (Hull - £22,338; Machinery - £18,458; fitting - £9,418)
Scourge: Total Cost £55,002 (Hull - £21,328; Machinery - £20,390; Fitting - £13,284)
Bulldog: Total Cost £58,122 (including Hull - 23,342; Machinery - £24,892; Fitting - £8,338)
Fury: Total Cost £51,688 (Hull - £24,764; Machinery - £22,142; Fitting - £4,782)

Notes

Citations

References
 Lyon Winfield, The Sail & Steam Navy List, All the Ships of the Royal Navy 1815 to 1889, by David Lyon & Rif Winfield, published by Chatham Publishing, London © 2004, 
 Winfield, British Warships in the Age of Sail (1817 – 1863), by Rif Winfield, published by Seaforth Publishing, England © 2014, e, Chapter 11 Steam Paddle Vessels, Vessels acquired since November 1830, Stromboli Class
 Colledge, Ships of the Royal Navy, by J.J. Colledge, revised and updated by Lt Cdr Ben Warlow and Steve Bush, published by Seaforth Publishing, Barnsley, Great Britain, © 2020, e  (EPUB)
 The Navy List, published by His Majesty's Stationery Office, London

Paddle sloops of the Royal Navy
Sloop classes